The Department of Physics and Astronomy at the University of Manchester is one of the largest and most active physics departments in the UK, taking around 250 new undergraduates and 50 postgraduates each year, and employing more than 80 members of academic staff and over 100 research fellows and associates. The department is based on two sites: the Schuster Laboratory on Brunswick Street and the Jodrell Bank Centre for Astrophysics in Cheshire, international headquarters of the Square Kilometre Array (SKA).

According to the Academic Ranking of World Universities, the department is the 9th best physics department in the world and best in Europe. It is ranked 2nd place in the UK by Grade Point Average (GPA) according to the Research Excellence Framework (REF) in 2021, being only behind the University of Sheffield. The University has a long history of physics dating back to 1874, which includes 12 Nobel laureates, most recently Andre Geim and Konstantin Novoselov who were awarded the Nobel Prize in Physics in 2010 for their discovery of graphene.

Research groups

The Department of Physics and Astronomy comprises eight research groups:
 Astronomy and Astrophysics
 Biological Physics
 Condensed Matter Physics
 Nonlinear Dynamics and Liquid Crystal Physics
 Photon Physics
 Particle Physics
 Nuclear Physics
 Theoretical Physics

Research in the department of Physics has been funded by the Particle Physics and Astronomy Research Council (PPARC), the Science and Technology Facilities Council (STFC) and the Royal Society.

Notable faculty

 the department employs 53 Professors, including Emeritus Professors.
 Teresa Anderson  Professor of Physics and co-founder of the Bluedot Festival
 Philippa Browning  Professor Astrophysics
 Brian Cox, Professor of Particle Physics, working on the ATLAS experiment at the Large Hadron Collider
 Philip Diamond, Professor of Photon Physics and Director General of the Square Kilometre Array (SKA)
 Wendy Flavell, Vice Dean for Research and a Professor of Surface Physics
 Jeffrey Forshaw, Professor of Particle Physics and co-author of The Quantum Universe
 Sir Andre Geim , Regius Professor & Royal Society Research Professor
 Sir Konstantin Novoselov,  Langworthy Professor of Physics
 Tim O'Brien, Professor of Astrophysics
 Terry Wyatt  Professor of Particle Physics

Notable alumni and former staff
 Sarah Bridle, Professor of Food, Climate and Society at the University of York
 Neil Burgess, University College London
 Tamsin Edwards, King's College London
 Yvonne Elsworth, University of Birmingham
 Danielle George, Professor of Radiofrequency Engineering

History

The department has origins dating back to 1874 when Balfour Stewart was appointed the first Langworthy Professor of Physics at Owens College, Manchester. Stewart was the first to identify an electrified atmospheric layer (now known as the ionosphere) which could distort the Earth's magnetic field. The theory of the ionosphere was postulated by Carl Friedrich Gauss in 1839, Stewart published the first experimental confirmation of the theory in 1878. Since then, the department has hosted many award-winning scientists including:
 Hans Bethe, awarded the Nobel Prize in Physics  in 1967
 Patrick Blackett, Baron Blackett, awarded the Nobel Prize in Physics in 1948
 Niels Bohr, awarded the Nobel Prize in Physics in 1922
 Sir William Lawrence Bragg, discovered Bragg's law and awarded the Nobel Prize in Physics in 1915
 Sir James Chadwick, awarded the Nobel Prize in Physics in 1935
 Sir John Cockcroft, awarded the Nobel Prize in Physics in 1951
 Rod Davies,   Professor of Radio Astronomy
 Richard Davis,  Professor of Astrophysics
 Samuel Devons, FRS
 Brian Flowers, Baron Flowers, FRS
 Sir Francis Graham-Smith, Astronomer Royal from 1982 to 1990
 Henry Hall, FRS who built the first dilution refrigerator
 Sir Bernard Lovell, creator of the Lovell Telescope at the Jodrell Bank Observatory
 Henry Moseley, creator of Moseley's law
 Nevill Francis Mott, awarded the Nobel Prize in Physics in 1977
 Ernest Rutherford, awarded the Nobel Prize in Chemistry in 1908 for splitting the atom
 Sir Arthur Schuster, FRS
 Balfour Stewart, first Langworthy Professor of Physics
 Sir Joseph John "J. J." Thomson, studied Physics at Owens College, Manchester aged 14, went on to run the Cavendish Laboratory in Cambridge and was awarded the 1906 Nobel Prize in Physics.

In 2004, the two separate departments of Physics at the Victoria University of Manchester and the University of Manchester Institute of Science and Technology (UMIST) were merged  to form the current Department of Physics and Astronomy at the University of Manchester.  The department was known as the School of Physics and Astronomy until a 2019 reshuffle.

Emeritus professors
The department is also home to several Emeritus Scientists, pursuing their research interests after their formal retirement including:
 Alexander Donnachie , Research Professor
 Andrew Lyne  Emeritus Professor & co-discoverer of the binary pulsar
 Robin Marshall, FRS, Professor of Physics & Biology
 Michael Moore, FRS, Emeritus Professor of Theoretical Physics

References

Physics
Astronomy education
Physics departments in the United Kingdom
Astronomy in the United Kingdom
Professional education in Manchester